Union Township is one of the fourteen townships of Lawrence County, Ohio, United States. As of the 2010 census the population was 9,086, of whom 7,767 lived in the unincorporated portions of the township.

Geography
Located in the southeastern part of the county along the Ohio River, it borders the following townships:
Windsor Township – north
Rome Township – east
Fayette Township – west
Lawrence Township – northwest corner

Cabell County, West Virginia, lies across the Ohio River to the south.

It is located upstream of most of the rest of Lawrence County's Ohio River townships.

Two villages are located along the shoreline of Union Township: Proctorville far upstream, and Chesapeake in the center.

Name and history
It is one of twenty-seven Union Townships statewide.

Government
The township is governed by a three-member board of trustees, who are elected in November of odd-numbered years to a four-year term beginning on the following January 1. Two are elected in the year after the presidential election and one is elected in the year before it. There is also an elected township fiscal officer, who serves a four-year term beginning on April 1 of the year after the election, which is held in November of the year before the presidential election. Vacancies in the fiscal officership or on the board of trustees are filled by the remaining trustees.

References

External links

County website

Townships in Lawrence County, Ohio
Townships in Ohio